Tičar is a Slovene surname. Notable people with the surname include:

 (1875–1946), Slovenian physician and mountaineer
Rok Tičar (born 1989), Slovenian ice hockey player

Slovene-language surnames